Ramanagar may refer to the following places:

Karnataka 
 Ramanagara, a town in Karnataka
 Ramanagara district
Ramanagaram (Vidhana Sabha constituency)
 Ramanagar, Belgaum, a village in Saundatti Taluk, Belgaum district
 Ramanagar, Indi, a village in Indi Taluk, Bijapur district
 Ramnagar, Bijapur, a village in Bijapur Taluk, Bijapur district
 Ramnagar, Basavana Bagevadi, a village in Basavana Bagevadi Taluk, Bijapur district
 Ramnagar, Uttara Kannada, a village in Supa (Joida) Taluk, Uttara Kannada district
 Ramnagar, Gulbarga, a village in Afzalpur Taluk, Gulbarga district
 Ramnagar, Yadgir, a village in Shorapur Taluk, Yadgir district

Uttar Pradesh 
 Ramanagar, Mahrajganj, a town in Nichlaul Taluk, Mahrajganj district

Assam 
 Ramanagar, Karbi Anglong, a village in Diphu Taluk, Karbi Anglong district

Jharkhand 
 Ramanagar, Sahibganj, a village in Sahibganj Taluk, Sahibganj district

Orissa 
 Ramanagar, Mayurbhanj, a village in Baripada Sadar Taluk, Mayurbhanj district
 Ramanagar, Baleshwar, a village in Soro Taluk, Baleshwar district
 Ramanagar, Kendrapara, a village in Mahakalapada Taluk, Kendrapara district

Andhra Pradesh 
 Ramanagaram, Srikakulam a village in Seethampeta Taluk, Srikakulam district

See also 
 Ramnagar (disambiguation)